Pholiotina smithii is a rare member of the genus Pholiotina which contains the hallucinogenic alkaloid psilocybin.  It was formerly known as Galera cyanopes 
 Photography and microscopy by Jordan luebben.

Description
Cap: 0.3 - 1(1.3) cm across Conic to convex but expands to nearly plane in age, with a distinct umbo, smooth, ochraceous tawny to cinnamon-brown, darker at edges, glistening when wet, hygrophanous, even to striate when moist. Lightens when it dries, turning a tan color.
Gills: adnate to adnexed, crowded to subdistant, narrow to moderately broad, pale grayish yellow to brown with whitish edges, darkening to rusty cinnamon brown in age. 
Spores: Cinnamon brown, (6.5)7.0 - 9.0 x 4.0 - 4.5(5) micrometers smooth and ellipsoid with thick walls and a small but distinct germ-pore.
Stipe: (1)2 to 5(7.5) cm long, .75 - 1(1.5) mm thick, mostly equal but often slightly swollen at the base. Fragile, whitish with fine fibrils but becoming smooth, lacks an annulus, slightly twisting striatulations, often slightly grayish at the base when young, becoming an azure shade of blue in age, quickly bruising blue when handled.
Taste: 
Odor: farinaceous.
Microscopic features: Subcapitate cheilocystidia.

Distribution and habitat

Pholiotina smithii is found in North America and often grows in bogs, ditches and swampy areas, commonly in sphagnum moss.  Also found along river banks and in lawns.

It is known to occur in Canada, Oregon, Wisconsin, Washington, and Northern Michigan, (on ancient man-made earthen mounds), but is probably more widely distributed.

On the west coast of America, Pholiotina smithii is an early summer mushroom, almost never appearing after the first week of June.

Edibility

Mildly hallucinogenic, containing psilocin, psilocybin, and baeocystin.  Most mycologists recommend against eating this mushroom because it is difficult to distinguish from poisonous species.

References

External links 
 Conocybe smithii photo
 A Worldwide Geographical Distribution of the Neurotropic Fungi

Bolbitiaceae
Entheogens
Psychoactive fungi
Psychedelic tryptamine carriers